Fairview Heights is a suburb located on the North Shore of Auckland, New Zealand. It is under local governance of Auckland Council. The area is defined by Lonely Track Road on the north, East Coast Road on the east, Oteha Valley Road on the south, and the Auckland Northern Motorway on the west. Until the end of the 20th century, the area was rural.

Demographics

Fairview Heights had a population of 3,897 at the 2018 New Zealand census, an increase of 966 people (33.0%) since the 2013 census, and an increase of 2,781 people (249.2%) since the 2006 census. There were 1,101 households, comprising 1,923 males and 1,974 females, giving a sex ratio of 0.97 males per female. The median age was 33.5 years (compared with 37.4 years nationally), with 687 people (17.6%) aged under 15 years, 1,026 (26.3%) aged 15 to 29, 1,683 (43.2%) aged 30 to 64, and 498 (12.8%) aged 65 or older.

Ethnicities were 39.3% European/Pākehā, 2.9% Māori, 1.4% Pacific peoples, 56.4% Asian, and 4.3% other ethnicities. People may identify with more than one ethnicity.

The percentage of people born overseas was 63.6, compared with 27.1% nationally.

Although some people chose not to answer the census's question about religious affiliation, 58.0% had no religion, 29.2% were Christian, 0.2% had Māori religious beliefs, 2.3% were Hindu, 1.8% were Muslim, 2.5% were Buddhist and 1.5% had other religions.

Of those at least 15 years old, 1,089 (33.9%) people had a bachelor's or higher degree, and 279 (8.7%) people had no formal qualifications. The median income was $30,100, compared with $31,800 nationally. 549 people (17.1%) earned over $70,000 compared to 17.2% nationally. The employment status of those at least 15 was that 1,434 (44.7%) people were employed full-time, 381 (11.9%) were part-time, and 132 (4.1%) were unemployed.

Notes

Suburbs of Auckland
North Shore, New Zealand